Lorrain Smith may refer to:

James Lorrain Smith (1862–1931), Scottish pathologist
Annie Lorrain Smith (1854–1937), British lichenologist

See also
Lorraine Smith Pangle (born 1958), American philosopher
Lauren Smith (disambiguation)
Lorrain (disambiguation)
Smith (disambiguation)